Greek Church may refer to
Eastern Orthodox Church
Church of Greece
Greek Orthodox Church
Greek Catholic Church
Greek Church (bowling term), the name of particular spare shot in bowling
Greek Church (Alba Iulia), Romania
Greek Church, Brăila, Romania
Greek Church (Brașov), Romania
Greek Church (Constanța), Romania